Princess Mathilde Sophie of Oettingen-Oettingen and Oettingen-Spielberg (in German: Mathilde Sophie, Prinzessin zu Oettingen-Oettingen und Oettingen-Spielberg; 9 February 1816 – 20 January 1886) was a member of the Princely House of Oettingen-Spielberg and a Princess of Oettingen-Oettingen and Oettingen-Spielberg by birth. Through her marriage to Maximilian Karl, 6th Prince of Thurn and Taxis, Mathilde Sophie  was also a member of the Princely House of Thurn and Taxis and Princess consort of Thurn and Taxis.

Family
Mathilde Sophie was the eldest daughter and second-eldest child of Johannes Aloysius III, Prince of Oettingen-Oettingen and Oettingen-Spielberg (1788-1855) and his wife Princess Amalie Auguste von Wrede (1796-1871).

Marriage and issue

Mathilde Sophie married Maximilian Karl, 6th Prince of Thurn and Taxis, fourth child of Karl Alexander, 5th Prince of Thurn and Taxis and his wife Duchess Therese of Mecklenburg-Strelitz, on 24 January 1839 in Oettingen, Kingdom of Bavaria. Mathilde Sophie and Maximilian Karl had twelve children:

Prince Otto of Thurn and Taxis (28 May 1840 – 6 July 1876)
Prince Georg of Thurn and Taxis (11 July 1841 – 22 December 1874)
Prince Paul of Thurn and Taxis (27 May 1843 – 10 March 1879)
Princess Amalie of Thurn and Taxis (12 May 1844 – 12 February 1867)
Prince Hugo of Thurn and Taxis (24 November 1845 – 15 May 1873)
Prince Gustav of Thurn and Taxis (23 February 1848 – 9 July 1914)
Prince Wilhelm of Thurn and Taxis (20 February 1849 – 11 December 1849)
Prince Adolf of Thurn and Taxis (26 May 1850 – 3 January 1890)
Prince Franz of Thurn and Taxis (2 March 1852 – 4 May 1897)
Prince Nikolaus of Thurn and Taxis (2 August 1853 – 26 May 1874)
Prince Alfred of Thurn and Taxis (11 June 1856 – 9 February 1886)
Princess Marie Georgine of Thurn and Taxis (25 December 1857 – 13 February 1909)

Ancestry

References

1816 births
1886 deaths
People from Oettingen in Bayern
House of Oettingen-Spielberg
Princesses of Thurn und Taxis
Burials at the Gruftkapelle, St. Emmeram's Abbey